A Dobbert or Dobert was a large ball bearing about the size of a golf ball used in games of marbles in South Lancashire after the Second World War. For example, in a game called Ringy, a circle was drawn on the ground and a fixed number of marbles from each boy were then placed into the ring. From a line drawn on the ground a short distance away, each boy would fire his Dobbert along the ground to try to knock the marbles out of the circle. Dobberts were acquired from local engineering factories.

By the 1960s, larger versions of the small glass marbles were being produced - about half the size of a golf ball - and these were called dobberts (sometimes abbreviated to a 'dob'). A dobbert was worth six marbles. A bag of marbles purchased (usually in the local sweet shop) contained six marbles for the same price as one dobbert. Both marbles and dobberts came with various swirling coloured patterns inside the hard glass sphere.

English games
Culture in Lancashire